Zec is a Serbian and Bosnian surname, borne by ethnic Serbs and Bosniaks in Bosnia and Herzegovina and Serbia. The word "zec" means rabbit. It may refer to:

Asim Zec (born 1994), Bosnian football player 
Darko Zec (born 1989), Slovenian football player
David Zec (born 2000), footballer
Donald Zec (1919–2021), British journalist
Đuro Zec (born 1990), Serbian football player
Ermin Zec (born 1988), Bosnian football player
Gojko Zec (1935–1995), Serbian football manager
Josie Zec (born 2000), American singer
Maša Zec Peškirič (born 1987), Slovenian tennis player
Miodrag Zec (born 1982), Montenegrin football player 
Nino Zec (born 1949), Serbian football player
Peter Zec (born 1956), German design consultant
Philip Zec (1909–1983), British political cartoonist and editor
Safet Zec (born 1943), Bosnian painter 

Croatian surnames
Serbian surnames
Slovene-language surnames
Surnames from nicknames